New Best Friends is the official debut album by Mansions.

The album was produced, recorded and mixed by Mike Sapone (Brand New, Taking Back Sunday, Straylight Run). Mastering by Fred Kevorkian (Willie Nelson, The Apples In Stereo, Maroon 5, Joseph Arthur, The National, and more).

The physical copy of the album includes a bonus-disc known as "The EP Initiative", a compilation album containing tracks from seven different EP's released throughout 2008 through very limited formats.

The album was also pressed to vinyl by Sophomore Lounge Records, with only 250 copies made.

Track listing
 "I Told a Lie" - 1:09
 "Talk Talk Talk" - 4:17
 "Por Favor Is Spanish" - 3:43
 "Holidaze" - 3:28
 "Curacao Blue" - 4:29
 "Insulated" - 4:29
 "Take It Back" - 3:16
 "Gotta Be Alone" - 3:38
 "The Worst Part" - 3:27
 "Substitute Angel" - 3:04
 "Millions of Pieces" - 4:01
 "All Eyes on You" - 3:51

Personnel
Band
All songs written by Christopher Browder
Christopher Browder - Vocals, Guitar, Keys, Bass, Percussion
Anthony Brock - Drums, percussion (Except on "Millions of Pieces")

Technical
Mike Sapone - Production, Mixing, Engineering.
Fred Kevorkian - Mastering

Artwork
Sarah Nelson - Design & Layout

References

2009 debut albums
Mansions (band) albums
Albums produced by Mike Sapone
Doghouse Records albums